Vocational education in the United States varies from state to state. Vocational schools are post-secondary schools (students usually enroll after graduating from high school or obtaining their GEDs) that teach the skills necessary to help students acquire jobs in specific industries. The majority of postsecondary career education is provided by proprietary (privately-owned) career institutions. About 30 percent of all credentials in teaching are provided by two-year community colleges, which also offer courses transferable to four-year universities. Other programs are offered through military teaching or government-operated adult education centers.

Although vocational education is usually less financially lucrative in the long term than a bachelor's degree, it can still provide a respectable income at much less cost in time and money for training. Even ten years after graduation, there are many people with a certificate or associate degree who earn more money than those with a B.A.

Historically, high schools have offered vocational courses such as home economics, wood and metal shop, typing, business courses, drafting, construction, and auto repair. However, for a number of reasons, many schools have cut those programs. Some schools no longer have the funding to support these programs, and schools have since put more emphasis on academics for all students because of standards based education reform. School-to-Work is a series of federal and state initiatives to link academics to work, sometimes including gaining work experience on a job site without pay.

Differences between vocational education and traditional education
The biggest difference between vocational education and traditional education is the amount of time students need to complete their education. Most vocational institutions offer programs that students can complete in about one year and a half to two years. Students attending traditional colleges often take four to complete their education. Traditional institutions also require students to complete a liberal arts education. Students must enroll in a broad range of courses that are not necessarily related to their area of study. Vocational institutions require students to enroll only in classes that pertain to their particular trades.

National programs

Federal involvement is carried out principally through the Carl D. Perkins Vocational and Technical Education Act. Accountability requirements tied to the receipt of federal funds under the act help to provide some overall leadership. The Office of Career, Technical, and Adult Education in the US Department of Education also supervises activities funded by the act, along with grants to individual states and other local programs. Persons wishing to teach vocational education may pursue a Bachelor of Vocational Education, which qualifies one to teach vocational education.

The Association for Career and Technical Education (ACTE) is the largest private association dedicated to the advancement of education that prepares youths and adults for careers. Its members include Career and Technical Education (CTE) teachers, administrators, and researchers.

Accreditation
There is, however, an issue with vocational or "career" schools that have national accreditation, instead of regional accreditation. Regionally-accredited schools are predominantly academically oriented, non-profit institutions. Nationally-accredited schools are predominantly for-profit and offer vocational, career, or technical programs. Every college has the right to set standards and refuse to accept transfer credits. However, if students have gone to a nationally-accredited school, transferring credits or even obtaining credit for a degree earned may be particularly difficult to transfer credits (or even credit for a degree earned) if they then apply to a regionally-accredited college. Some regionally-accredited colleges have general policies against accepting any credits from nationally-accredited schools. Others are reluctant to do so because they feel that nationally-accredited schools have lower academic standards than their own or because they are unfamiliar with a particular school. Students who plan to transfer to a regionally-accredited school after studying at a nationally-accredited school should ensure that they will be able to transfer the credits before they attend the latter school.

There have been lawsuits regarding nationally-accredited schools that lead prospective students to believe that they would have no problem transferring their credits to regionally-accredited schools, most notably Florida Metropolitan University and Crown College, Tacoma, Washington. Schools that have been targeted but not been found guilty include University of Phoenix and Vatterott College.

The US Department of Education has stated, however, that its criteria for recognition of accreditors "do not differentiate between types of accrediting agencies, so the recognition granted to all types of accrediting agencies — regional, institutional, specialized, and programmatic — is identical." However the same letter states also that "the specific scope of recognition varies according to the type of agency recognized."

Job retraining

In many states, vocational education is available to workers who have been previously laid off or whose previous employer is defunct. Such teaching was expanded under the American Recovery and Reinvestment Act of 2009. Though results have been, for the most part, inconclusive, job retraining programs have been noted to retain a positive effect on employee morale. Even in cases of displacement, those who underwent job retraining programs exhibited a more positive outlook on their circumstances than those employees who did not partake in job retraining programs. Several studies have also suggested that for layoffs, employees who remain with the company exhibit positive morale and are more motivated in their work environment if the layoffs are handled effectively by the company.

Job retraining programs in the United States are often criticized for their lack of proper focus on skills that are required in existing jobs. A 2009 study by the US Department of Labor showed that the difference in earnings and the chances of being rehired between those who had been was taught and those who had not was small.

History

In the early 20th century, a number of efforts were made to imitate German-style industrial education in the United States. Researchers such as Holmes Beckwith described the relationship between the apprenticeship and continuation school models in Germany and suggested variants of the system that could be applied in an American context. The industrial education system evolved, after large-scale growth after World War I, into modern vocational education. This CTE (Career Technical Education) Historical Timeline illustrates that evolution:
 Vocational education was initiated with the passing of the Smith-Hughes Act in 1917, set up to reduce the reliance on foreign vocational schools, improve domestic wage earning capacity, reduce unemployment, and protect national security. 
 Around 1947, the George-Barden Act expanded federal support of vocational education to support vocations beyond agriculture, trade, home economics, and industrial subjects.
 The National Defense Education Act, signed in 1958, focused on improving education in science, mathematics, foreign languages, and other critical areas, especially in national defense.
 In 1963, the Vocational Education Act added support for vocational education schools for work-study programs and research. 
 The Vocational Education Amendments of 1968 modified the Act and created the National Advisory Council on Vocational Education.
 The Vocational Education Act was renamed the Carl D. Perkins Vocational and Technical Education Act in 1984.
 Amendments in 1990 created the Tech-Prep Program, designed to coordinate educational activities into a coherent sequence of courses.
 The Act was renamed the Carl D. Perkins Career and Technical Education Act of 2006.

Career and Technical Education 
A relatively recent innovation, Career and Technical Education (CTE) programs have begun to appear that supplement or replace vocational schools. CTE provides opportunities to earn certificates and degrees that teach in-demand skills but provide a fast track to the work force. Unlike the former "vocational" programs, CTE programs and degrees are meant to be academic and stackable. They bear credits, and individuals can build on to them through continued education. These programs can span from culinary arts and hospitality management to fire science, computer science, and nursing. However, all offerings include a one-year certificate or two-year degree and with a high-skilled hands-on learning experience. Some jurisdictions are introducing CTE alternatives to standard high schools as a means of addressing student engagement and drop-out issues. CTE programs are shown to promote  engagement for students who feel disconnected from traditional education models.

New York City's CTE high schools

In 2008, the New York City Department of Education began to rethink vocational education in high schools. Mayor Michael Bloomberg, in his State of the City 2008 address, said, "This year, we're going to begin dramatically transforming how high school students prepare for technical careers in a number of growing fields. Traditionally, such career and technical education has been seen as an educational dead-end. We're going to change that. College isn't for everyone, but education is. Building on work by the State Education Department, we'll do what no other public school system in the nation has done- create rigorous career and technical programs that start in high schools and continue in our community colleges" A hallmark of New York City public education is school choice. One category of schools students could choose since the early 20th century has been the vocational high school. In recent years, several new CTE high schools have been started in New York City or reforged with a new perspective. The idea behind this reconfiguration of CTE is that vocational positions are becoming increasingly sophisticated, and a high school degree will not be sufficient. Future professionals will need more advanced education. The new CTE schools prepare students for college courses in addition to providing a vocational courses. A new vocational high school, called City Polytechnic High School, will allow students to take college courses while still in high school. While many high schools in New York City offer college courses as part of their curriculum, City Poly, as the school is known, is the first to offer programs in technical fields. Students will graduate in five years, instead of the usual four, with a high school diploma and an associate degree.

Some New York City Career Technical Education (CTE) schools are the following:
 Brooklyn Technical High School, founded in 1922, offers two-year major courses in civil, chemical, mechanical, and electrical engineering, as well as architectural design and computer science. 
 Aviation Career & Technical Education High School, founded in 1925, known for supplying 12 percent of all of the workers on aircraft worldwide and sending several graduates to high-level engineering programs, such as Columbia School of Engineering and Applied Science and Massachusetts Institute of Technology. Famous alumni include Whitey Ford and Michael Bentt.
 High School of Art and Design, founded in 1936. Famous alumni include Tony Bennett, Lenny White, and Tom Sito.
 New York Harbor School, founded in 2003, is known for being the first organization not in the US military to be housed on Governors Island in New York City Harbor since the Lenape. The school is also known for sending graduates to Cornell University and other prestigious schools in addition to supplying well-trained workers on New York City's 600 mi waterfront. This school has the second certified SCUBA program in a high school in the United States.

See also

Agricultural education
Apprenticeship in the United States
Community colleges in the United States
Family and consumer science
Finishing school
Further education
Job Corps
Life skills
Training
Retraining
Vocational school
Vocational university
List of vocational colleges in the United States

References

External links
US Dept of Education - Office of Career, Technical, and Adult Education